Marc Mbombo Koda is a Democratic Republic of the Congo athlete and Taekwondo practitioner. He represented the DRC at the 2015 All-Africa Games, competing in the Taekwondo men's featherweight (-68 kg) category, in which he won the bronze medal. He also took part in several other regional tournaments.

References

African Games bronze medalists for DR Congo
Democratic Republic of the Congo taekwondo practitioners
Living people
Year of birth missing (living people)
Competitors at the 2015 African Games
African Games medalists in taekwondo
21st-century Democratic Republic of the Congo people